This is a list of alumni of the University of Westminster (including its predecessor institutions).

Architecture and Urban Design

Art

Business

Fashion

Film and television

Government and politics

Literature

Media and journalism

Music

Photography
Arnis Balcus - photographer; video artist
Stuart Roy Clarke – photographer, known for his major work The Homes Of Football
Iain Macmillan – photographer (cover of The Beatles' Abbey Road album)
Scarlet Page – photographer and daughter of Led Zeppelin guitarist Jimmy Page
Olivier Richon – photographer and Professor of Photography at the Royal College of Art
Jo Spence – photographer, known for the documentation of her struggle with cancer

Science and engineering

Sports
Lambros Athanassoulas – Greek rally driver
Colin Charvis – rugby player and captain of the Welsh national rugby team
Herbert Gayler - Olympic Cyclist and 12 hour record holder.
Dunia Susi – England women's football player
Frank Turner - three-times Olympics gymnast

Miscellaneous

References 

 
Westminster
University of Westminster alumni